The article provides links to lists of military corps arranged by ordinal number, name, country or conflict.

By number 

 I Corps
 II Corps
 III Corps
 IV Corps
 V Corps
 VI Corps
 VII Corps
 VIII Corps
 IX Corps
 X Corps
 XI Corps
 XII Corps
 XIII Corps
 XIV Corps
 XV Corps
 XVI Corps
 XVII Corps
 XVIII Corps
 XIX Corps
 XX Corps
 XXI Corps
 XXII Corps
 XXIII Corps
 XXIV Corps
 XXV Corps
 XXVI Corps
 XXVII Corps
 XXVIII Corps
 XXIX Corps
 XXX Corps

By name

By conflict

 List of British corps in World War I
 List of British corps in World War II
 List of Finnish corps in the Winter War
 List of Finnish corps in the Continuation War
 List of German corps in World War II
 List of corps of the United States

Military corps